Cathedral State Park is the largest virgin timber tract remaining in West Virginia. The park features trees of up to 90 feet in height and 16 feet in circumference.  Located on  about one mile (1.6 km) east of the town of Aurora and five miles west of Redhouse, Maryland, Cathedral is a mixed forest of predominantly eastern hemlock.  Rhine Creek runs through the park.

The National Park Service has designated the park as a National Natural Landmark in 1965.

The park is under significant threat from the hemlock woolly adelgid, which has been detected within  of the park.

History  
Mr Branson Haas, a workman for the Brookside hotel, purchased the land in 1922 and sold it to the state of West Virginia in 1942. It was included in the Brookside Historic District. The park was entered in the National Registry for Natural History Landmarks on October 6, 1966. The Society of American Foresters recognized the park in 1983 in its National Natural Areas program.

In 2004, the state's largest hemlock tree was felled by lightning.

In October 2012, the park suffered extensive damage resulting from snowfall produced by Hurricane Sandy.

Trails

See also
 List of West Virginia state parks
 State park
 List of old growth forests
 List of National Natural Landmarks
 List of National Natural Landmarks in West Virginia

References

External links 
 

State parks of West Virginia
Protected areas of Preston County, West Virginia
National Natural Landmarks in West Virginia
Northwestern Turnpike
Protected areas established in 1942
National Register of Historic Places in Preston County, West Virginia
Parks on the National Register of Historic Places in West Virginia
IUCN Category III
Historic district contributing properties in West Virginia